This is a list of military engagements of World War II encompassing land, naval, and air engagements as well as campaigns, operations, defensive lines and sieges. Campaigns generally refer to broader strategic operations conducted over a large bit of territory and over a long period. Battles generally refer to short periods of intense combat localised to a specific area and over a specific period. However, use of the terms in naming such events is not consistent. For example, the Battle of the Atlantic was more or less an entire theatre of war, and the so-called battle lasted for the duration of the entire war. Another misnomer is the Battle of Britain, which by all rights should be considered a campaign, not a mere battle.

Battles

1939

1940

1941

1942

1943

1944

1945

Sieges 
 Siege of Warsaw
 Siege of Leningrad
 Siege of Lwów
 Siege of Modlin
 Siege of Novorossiysk
 Siege of Odessa
 Siege of Sevastopol
 Siege of Tobruk
 Siege of Budapest
 Siege of Breslau
 Siege of Bastogne
 Siege of Budapest (1945)

Naval engagements 
General
 Arctic Convoys
 Battle of the Atlantic – the name given to the conflict in the Atlantic Ocean between 1939 and 1945.
 see also Timeline of the Battle of the Atlantic
 Battle of the Mediterranean
 Battle of the Indian Ocean

Specific
1939
 The Battle of the River Plate
1940
 First Battle of Narvik
 Second Battle of Narvik
1941
 Battle of Cape Matapan
 Battle of Pearl Harbor
1942
 Battle of the Coral Sea
 Battle of Midway
 Battle of Guadalcanal
1943
 Battle of the Komandorski Islands
1944
 Battle of Leyte Gulf
1945
 Operation Ten-Go

Major bombing campaigns 
General
 Strategic bombing during World War II
 Strategic bombing survey for the overall impact of the bombing.

Specific
 Baedeker raids
 Chungking
 Coventry
 Operation Retribution (1941) – bombing of Belgrade during 1941.
 Broome – Japanese raid on the town of Broome, targeting the airfield.
 Dresden
 Darwin – Japanese target the harbour.
 Hamburg
 Helsinki – February 1944, was mostly ineffective due to air defence and deception.
 Hiroshima – One nuclear weapon, Little Boy dropped from a B-29, devastating a city.
 Kassel
 London – "The Blitz" and the V-1 and V-2 campaigns
 Lübeck
 Nagasaki – One nuclear weapon, Fat Man dropped from a B-29, devastating a city.
 Narva – March 1944. Evacuated town was destroyed by Soviet ADD.
 Pearl Harbor
 Rostock – Heinkel Airplane Construction Plant, Seaport, and City
 Rotterdam
 Stalingrad – 23 August 1942
 Tallinn – February–March 1944. Bombed by Soviet ADD. Large-scale damage.
 Tokyo – Several devastating raids.
 Warsaw

Operations

Raids
Small to medium-sized raiding operations were carried out by both Allied and Axis armies during World War II. The modus operandi used included guerrilla attacks by partisans in occupied territory and/or combined operations involving the landing and removal of specialised light infantry, such as commandos, by means of small boats.
 Allied
 Operation Colossus
 10 February 1941
 Experimental raid by 38 British Commandos on a fresh water aqueduct near Calitri in southern Italy.
 Operation Claymore
 4 March 1941
 1000 Men from the British Commandos and belonging to the Norwegian Independent Company 1 destroy fish oil factories on the remote islands off the coast of Norway.
 Operation Archery
 27 December 1941
 570 men from the British Commandos and belonging to the Norwegian Independent Company 1 raid  and attack German positions on Vågsøy Island in Norway.
 Battle of Timor
 19 February 1942 – 10 February 1943
 Continuous raids from Australian commandos against the occupying Japanese.
 Operation Chariot
 28 March 1942
 196 Royal Navy and Army Commando units raid and destroy the heavily defended docks of St. Nazaire in occupied France.
 Dieppe Raid
 19 August 1942
 Over 6,000 infantrymen, mostly Canadian attempted to seize and hold the port of Dieppe.
 Makin Island raid, 17–18 August 1942
 Operation Jaywick, September 1943
 Operation Jedburgh, 1944
 Operation Roast, April 1945
 Axis
 Operation Greif, December 1944

Raiding units
 Allied
 Multinational
 Chindits
 Devil's Brigade
 Z Special Unit
 Popski's Private Army
 Gideon Force
 Australia
 Australian Army Independent Companies
 France
 Far East French Expeditionary Forces
 Intervention Light Corps
 Greece
 Sacred Band
 United Kingdom
 Long Range Desert Group
 Special Air Service
 Royal Marines
 Special Operations Executive
 British Army Commandos
 Layforce
 British Paratroopers
 United States
 Marine Raiders
 US Army Rangers
 Alamo Scouts
 Merrill's Marauders
 Axis
 Nazi Germany
 Brandenburger Regiment
 Waffen-SS (commando force led by Otto Skorzeny).
 Fascist Italy
 Decima Flottiglia MAS
 Empire of Japan
 Special Naval Landing Forces

Defensive lines 
 Atlantic Wall
 Caesar Line
 GHQ Line
 Gothic Line
 Gustav Line
 Maginot Line
 Mannerheim Line
 Metaxas Line
 Siegfried Line
 Taunton Stop Line

Contemporaneous wars 
 Chinese Civil War
 Ecuadorian–Peruvian War
 Greek Civil War
 Second Italo-Abyssinian War
 Soviet-Japanese Border War (1939)
 Spanish Civil War
 Afghan tribal revolts of 1944–1947

See also 
 Campaigns of World War II
 Participants in World War II
 List of World War II military operations
 List of battles 1901–2000

Engagements
Military engagements 
Military engagements